Avoda (Work) may refer to:

Israeli Labor Party
Camp Avoda in Massachusetts
 Avodah